Madcap may refer to:

People
 Madcap Moss, professional wrestler for WWE

Arts, media and entertainment

In comics
 Madcap (comics), a fictional character in the Marvel Universe

In film and video
 Madcap (project), an annotated video project of Xerox PARC

In music
 The Madcaps, an Austrian band of the 1960s and 1970s
 The Madcap Laughs, an album by former Pink Floyd member Syd Barrett
 'Madcap", a song by Polish gothic metal band Sirrah, from their album Did Tomorrow Come...

In theater
 Madcap Theater, a shortform improvisational comedy group

Technology
 Multicast Address Dynamic Client Allocation Protocol, MADCAP as defined by IETF 
 MadCap Software, a software company

Vehicles
 Tamiya Madcap, 1/10 scale off-road buggy